Mörby is the name of several localities in Sweden and Finland:

Sweden
 , Stockholm County
 Mörby centrum, a shopping mall
 Mörby centrum metro station
 Mörby railway station, on Roslagsbanan
 Mörby, Ekerö Municipality, Stockholm County
 Morby stone